Tramea eurybia is a species of dragonfly in the family Libellulidae, 
known as the dune glider. 
It inhabits still waters on the Andaman Islands, Sumatra, Sulawesi, the Maluku Islands, New Guinea and Fiji; and can be found at dune lakes in eastern Australia.
It is a medium-sized dragonfly with red, brown and black markings and a distinctive dark patch at the base of the hindwing.

Tramea eurybia appears similar to Tramea stenoloba.

Gallery

See also
 List of Odonata species of Australia
 List of Odonata species of India

References

Libellulidae
Odonata of Oceania
Odonata of Australia
Insects of New Guinea
Insects of Indonesia
Insects of India
Taxa named by Edmond de Sélys Longchamps
Insects described in 1878